Balcom is an unincorporated community in Union County, Illinois, United States.

Red Corzine (1909-2003), football player, was born in Balcom.

References

Unincorporated communities in Union County, Illinois
Unincorporated communities in Illinois